Extra(ordinary) People is a 1984 collection of feminist science fiction stories by Joanna Russ.
The novella "Souls" won the 1983 Hugo Award for the best novella.

Contents
 "Souls" (1982) novella, originally published in F&SF, January 1982.
 "The Mystery of the Young Gentleman" (1982) novelette, originally published in Speculations ed. by Isaac Asimov and Alice Laurence
 "Bodies" (1984) novelette.
 "What Did You Do During the Revolution, Grandma?" (1983) novelette, originally published in The Seattle Review, Spring 1983.
 "Everyday Depressions" (1984) short story.

External links
 
 

1984 short story collections
Short story collections by Joanna Russ
Science fiction short story collections
Feminist science fiction
St. Martin's Press books